Thomas Greatorex (5 October 1758 – 18 July 1831) was an English composer, astronomer and mathematician. As well as being organist of Westminster Abbey, he was a Fellow of the Royal Society.

Career
Born in Wingfield near Chesterfield, Derbyshire, Greatorex as a youngster studied with Benjamin Cooke, organist of Westminster Abbey, and was a protégé of the Earl of Sandwich. For four years he was organist of Carlisle Cathedral and from there went to live and work in Italy, where he became a friend of Charles Edward Stuart, or "Bonnie Prince Charlie." When the Young Pretender died in 1788, he left some of his music books to Greatorex, who returned to London the same year.

He was soon in much demand as a music teacher and succeeded Joah Bates as conductor of the Concerts of Ancient Music. He also directed music festivals at Birmingham, York and Derby. In 1819, he succeeded George Ebenezer Williams as organist of Westminster Abbey.

His works as a composer include the anthem This is the Day the Lord Hath Made.

Family
His father, Anthony Greatorex, became organist at St Martin's Church, Leicester (now Leicester Cathedral) in 1765. Thomas's sister Martha succeeded her father in that position from 1772 to 1800. From 1771, Anthony was organist at St Modwen's, Burton upon Trent, in which role Thomas succeeded him.

Thomas Greatorex married and had five sons. One of these, Henry Wellington Greatorex, became a church organist in Hartford, Connecticut, United States, and composed many hymns. Another son, Thomas junior, became organist of Holy Trinity, Burton on Trent.

Trivia
There is a story that King George IV, when Prince Regent, once said to Thomas Greatorex, "My father is Rex, but you are a Greater Rex".

References

Sources
Sadie, S. (ed.) (1980) The New Grove Dictionary of Music & Musicians, vol. 7.
The Name of Greatorex

The Noblemens and Gentlemen's Catch Club

1758 births
1831 deaths
English composers
English classical organists
British male organists
Cathedral organists
Fellows of the Royal Society
Fellows of the Linnean Society of London
Master of the Choristers at Westminster Abbey
Male classical organists